Trawlebane (also Tralibane) is a townland in western County Cork, Ireland. Birthplace to Francis O'Neill (1848-1936). O'Neill grew up on his family farm near the bridge. There is a bronze plaque in his honour near the bridge in Trawlebane. Not far from the bridge is a statue of Francis O'Neill along with other commemorative plaques.
The area is officially known as "Trawlebane" although O'Neill spelled it "Tralibane". Today, it is described as being in the Electoral Division of Gortnascreeny, in Civil Parish of Caheragh, in the Barony of West Carbery (West Division), in the County of Cork.

The Irish name for Trawlebane is Trá Líobáin.

Location 
The nearest large town to Trawlebane is Bantry. The Kerry border is further west.

Prehistoric Monuments 
A five stone circle is also nearby.

References

Townlands of County Cork